Maria Colombo (born 25 May 1989) is an Italian mathematician specializing in mathematical analysis. She is a professor at the EPFL (École Polytechnique Fédérale de Lausanne) in Switzerland, where she holds the chair for mathematical analysis, calculus of variations and partial differential equations.

Education and career
Colombo was born in Luino, near the Swiss border of Italy. She competed for Italy in the 2005, 2006, and 2007 International Mathematical Olympiads, earning bronze, gold, and silver medals respectively.

She earned bachelor's and master's degrees in mathematics at the University of Pisa in 2010 and 2011, and completed a Ph.D. in 2015 at the Scuola Normale Superiore di Pisa, under the joint supervision of Luigi Ambrosio and Alessio Figalli. Her dissertation, Flows of non-smooth vector fields and degenerate elliptic equations: With applications to the Vlasov-Poisson and semigeostrophic systems, was published as a book in 2017 by Edizioni della Normale.

After postdoctoral research with Camillo De Lellis at the University of Zurich, she joined the EPFL as an assistant professor in 2018, and was promoted to full professor in 2021.

Recognition
The Accademia dei Lincei gave Colombo their Gioacchino Iapichino Prize for 2016. She is the 2022 winner of the biennial Peter Lax Award, to be given at the International Conference on Hyperbolic Problems, and the 2023 winner of the Collatz Prize of the International Council for Industrial and Applied Mathematics, "for her fundamental contributions to regularity theory and the analysis of singularities in elliptic partial differential equations, geometric variational problems, transport equations, and incompressible fluid dynamics".

References

External links
Home page
Website of the Chair of Mathematical Analysis, Calculus of Variations and PDEs

1989 births
Living people
Italian mathematicians
Italian women mathematicians
Mathematical analysts
University of Pisa alumni
Scuola Normale Superiore di Pisa alumni
Academic staff of the École Polytechnique Fédérale de Lausanne
International Mathematical Olympiad participants